"Playboys" is a song by the Finnish rock band The Rasmus (then named just "Rasmus"), originally released on the band's second album with the same name, Playboys on 29 August 1997.

The single was released in 1997 by the record label Warner Music Finland. It is the third single  from the album Playboys, and features only the track "Playboys".

"Playboys" is a fairly happy, upbeat song and shows what the album is all about. The song is about playboys, and not "playing boys". The lyrics boast that because the singer is rich, he does not need to get a job and can do whatever he likes.

Track listing
 "Playboys" – 2:45

Music video
"Playboys" is the only song from the album that was released as a music video. The video shows a room with celebrities' faces on the wall and the band playing their instruments.

Other appearances
"Playboys" is also available on the band's compilation album Hell of a Collection which was released in 2001.

External links
 The Rasmus' official website
 Lyrics
 "Playboys" music video on YouTube

The Rasmus songs
1997 singles
Warner Music Group singles
Songs written by Lauri Ylönen
1997 songs
Songs written by Pauli Rantasalmi